Gensis was the Roman settlement vicus in Moesia Superior, now central Serbia, on Cer mountain near Lešnica.

Tabula Peutingeriana
It is recorded in the Tabula Peutingeriana as situated XXX m.p. south of Sirmium, on via Argentaria, a road leading in the direction of Drina; on the mountain Cer area, and XV m.p. from Ad Drinum (allegedly today's Loznica).

Position
However, the position of Gensis is not established because on the same mountain Cer are located ruins of the three different settlements that can be vicus Gensis, Vidin Grad, Kosanin grad and Trojanov Grad.
As none of these three sites has been explored, it is not possible to determine the exact position of vicus Gensis.

See also
Museum in Loznica
Vidin Grad
Koviljkin grad
Trojanov Grad

References
Aleksandar Deroko, Medieval cities in Serbia, Montenegro and Macedonia, Belgrade, 1950.
Massimiliano Pavan, From the Adriatic to the Danube Padova, 1991.

External links
Location of mountain Cer from a Bing Maps

Archaeological sites in Serbia
Roman towns and cities in Serbia